PopRocks is a satellite radio music channel that plays pop rock music from the 1990s, 2000s, and 2010s. It airs on Sirius XM Radio (channel 12) and Dish Network.

History 
PopRocks debuted on August 17, 2017, as a full-time channel devoted to the pop-rock genre of music from the 1990s, 2000s, and 2010s.

On June 18, 2020, PopRocks moved from channel 17 to channel 12, replacing WHTZ (Z100). The Bridge took over PopRocks' former slot.

Selected artists played 

 Avril Lavigne
 Coldplay
 Dave Matthews Band
 Fall Out Boy
 Gin Blossoms
 Goo Goo Dolls
 Green Day
 New Radicals
 Nickelback
 No Doubt
 Sheryl Crow
 The Killers
 Third Eye Blind
 Train
 Weezer

References

See also 
 List of Sirius XM Radio channels

Decades themed radio stations
Sirius Satellite Radio channels
XM Satellite Radio channels
1990s-themed radio stations
2000s-themed radio stations
Pop rock
Radio stations established in 2017
Sirius XM Radio channels